Indian and the Puritan is a 1916 marble and bronze monument by Gutzon Borglum, the sculptor of Mount Rushmore, opposite 5 Washington Street, the Newark Public Library, in Washington Park of Newark in Essex County, New Jersey. It was added to the National Register of Historic Places on October 28, 1994, as part of the Public Sculpture in Newark, New Jersey Multiple Property Submission.

History and description
The monument is a  bronze lamp standard featuring two carved marble sculptures, a Native American and a Puritan. The lamp standard has Newark's city seal and two inscriptions that describe the city's history. The monument was commissioned by the city to commemorate its 250th anniversary, 1666–1916. It was moved to its current location in Washington Park in 1977.

Other sculptures by Borglum in Newark are: Seated Lincoln (1911), First Landing Party of the Founders of Newark (1916),  and Wars of America (1926).

See also 
 List of public art in Newark, New Jersey
 National Register of Historic Places listings in Essex County, New Jersey

References

External links
 

Buildings and structures completed in 1916
Public art in Newark, New Jersey
Monuments and memorials on the National Register of Historic Places in New Jersey
1916 sculptures
National Register of Historic Places in Newark, New Jersey
New Jersey Register of Historic Places
Sculptures of Native Americans
Sculptures by Gutzon Borglum